Patrick Scaglia is chairman of the Y Combinator Research's project Human Advancement Research Community (HARC). Before that, he was co-director of Foundry@CITRIS and a Hewlett Packard executive for twelve years.

References

Year of birth missing (living people)
Living people
American businesspeople
Hewlett-Packard people
Y Combinator people